Bowed string instruments are a subcategory of string instruments that are played by a bow rubbing the strings. The bow rubbing the string causes vibration which the instrument emits as sound.

Despite the numerous specialist studies devoted to the origin of the bowing the problem of the origin of the bowing is unresolved 

Some say that the bow was introduced to Europe from the Middle East  while others say the bow was not introduced from the Middle East, but the other way round, that that the bow may have had its origin from a more frequent intercourse with North Europe and Western Europe

List of bowed string instruments

Violin family

 Pochette
 Violin (violino) 
 Viola (altviol, bratsche)
 Cello (violoncello)
 Double bass (contrabasso)
Variants on the standard members of the violin family include
 Tenor violin
 Five string violin
 Cello da spalla
 Baroque violin
 Kontra
 Kit violin
 Sardino
 Stroh violin
 Låtfiol
 Hardanger fiddle
 Lira da braccio
 Octobass

Viol family (Viola da Gamba family)

 Treble viol (treble viola da gamba)
 Alto viol (alto viola da gamba)
 Tenor viol (tenor viola da gamba)
 Bass viol (bass viola da gamba)
Variants on the standard four members of the viol family include:
 Pardessus de viol
 Division viol
 Lyra viol
 Baryton
 Violone
 Viola d'amore
 Lirone
 Vihuela de arco

Lyra and rebec type

 Byzantine lyra
 Cretan lyra
 Calabrian lira
 Gadulka
 Lijerica
 Ghaychak
 Pochette
 Rebec
 Rabeca
 Rebab
 Kemenche
 Kamancheh
 Shah Kaman
 Kemençe of the Black Sea
 Classical kemençe

Chinese bowed instruments

 Banhu
 Daguangxian
 Dahu
 Dihu
 Diyingehu
 Erhu
 Erxian
 Gaohu
 Gehu
 Huqin
 Jiaohu
 Jinghu
 Jing erhu
 
 Laruan
 Leiqin
 Matouqin
 Maguhu
 Sanhu
 Sihu
 Tiqin
 Tihu
 Tuhu
 Yehu
 Yazheng
 Xiqin
 Zhonghu
 Zhuihu
 Zhuiqin
 Wenzhenqin
 Zhengni

Rosined wheel instruments

The following instruments are sounded by means of a turning wheel that acts as the bow.

 Organistrum
 Hurdy-gurdy
 Donskoy ryley
 Dulcigurdy a.k.a. Vielle à roue et à manche
 Drejelire
 Lira
 tekerő
 Ninera
 Kaisatsuko
 Violano Virtuoso
 Wheelharp
 Viola organista
 Harmonichord
 Bowed clavier

Other bowed instruments

 Masenqo
 Violoncello da spalla
 Ravanahatha
 Ajaeng
 Yaylı tambur
 Kingri string Instrument
 Shichepshin
 Đàn nhị
 Đàn hồ
 Đàn gáo
 Sohaegeum
 Haegeum
 Kokyū
 sorud
 Chuurqin
 Daxophone
 Arpeggione
 Bowed psaltery
 Bowed dulcimer
 Jouhikko
 Talharpa
 Gue
 Vielle
 Giga
 Fiðla
 Tautirut
 Agiarut
 Crwth
 Neola
 Bowed guitar
 Musical saw
 Morin khuur
 Gusle
 Saw duang
 Saw sam sai
 Saw u
 Salo (instrument)
 Tro Khmer
 Tro sau toch
 Tro sau thom
 Tro u
 huqin
 Sarangi
 Sarangi (Nepali)
 Sarinda
 Esraj
 Nyckelharpa (Swedish keyed fiddle)
 Ghaychak
 Gadulka
 Gudok
 Kobyz
 Sorahi
 Byzaanchy
 Igil
 Imzad
 Umbang

See also
Bow stroke

References